Baltiysky (masculine), Baltiyskaya (feminine), or Baltiyskoye (neuter) is the name of several rural localities in Russia:
Baltiysky (rural locality), a settlement in Baltiysky Selsoviet of Kursky District of Stavropol Krai
Baltiyskoye, a logging depot settlement under the administrative jurisdiction of  Primorskoye Settlement Municipal Formation, Vyborgsky District, Leningrad Oblast